Urshak (Örşäk) is a rural locality (a village) in Urshakbashkaramalinsky Selsoviet, Miyakinsky District, Bashkortostan, Russia. The population was 413 as of 2010. There are 3 streets.

Geography 
Urshak is located 37 km east of Kirgiz-Miyaki (the district's administrative centre) by road. Urshakbashkaramaly is the nearest rural locality.

References 

Rural localities in Miyakinsky District